The Ministry of Aviation Industry of the USSR was the government ministry of the Soviet Union which oversaw production of the aviation industry. Before 1946 it was known as the People's Commissariat of Aviation Industry of the USSR (Народный комиссариат авиационной промышленности CCCP – Наркомавиапром).

History
A January 11, 1939 decree of the Presidium of the Supreme Soviet of the USSR created the People's Commissariat of Aviation Industry of the USSR from the I Board (aircraft) of the People's Commissariat of Defence Industry of the USSR.

According to Decree No. 4C of the Council of People's Commissars of 21 January 1939, the NCAP took over:
 Main Boards no. 1, 5, 10 and 18 of the former People's Commissariat of Defence Industry, which supported the production of aircraft, aircraft engines and equipment along with related businesses;
 assembly companies no. 18, 20, 30, 31, trust Orgoboronprom (Оргоборонпром) and trust Ostekhupravlenie (Остехуправление);
 design offices no. 1, 5, 10;
 aviation institutes in Moscow, Kazan, Kharkov, Rybinsk, Kuibyshev Institute of Engineering and Construction in Novosibirsk, Moscow Department of Lenpromakademia, Institute of Training of Engineers and Aviation Management Personnel in Moscow;
 15 technical schools (aviation in Moscow, and at the plant no. 24, engineering at the Ordzhonikidze plant, electro-radio in Gorky and Voronezh, mechanical in Vladimir, and others);
 2 evening departments (Рабочий факультет) – air in Moscow and industrial in Perm;
 99 plant-schools.

In September 1939 the Politburo of the CPSU (b) adopted a resolution on "the reconstruction and building aircraft factories." It predicted a more than 50% increase in the production capacity of aircraft factories by the end of 1941 in comparison to 1939. A decision was made to build nine new aircraft manufacturing plants and reconstruct the existing nine.

On March 15, 1946 the Commissariat was transformed into the Ministry of Aviation Industry of the USSR (Министерство авиационной промышленности СССР).

Headquarters
Headquarters was located in Moscow at the Ulansky Lane in two buildings No.  16 and 22 (architect ) built in 1936 for headquarters of the Metrostroy company. Since 1939 the headquarters of the People's Commissariat of Aviation Industry have been placed here.

List of ministers
Source:
 Mikhail Kaganovich (11.01.1939 – 10.01.1940)
 Aleksey Shakhurin (10.01.1940 – 15.03.1946)
 Mikhail Khrunichev (19.03.1946 – 15.03.1953)
 Pjotr Dementyev (24.08.1953 – 14.12.1957; 02.10.1965 – 14.05.1977)
 Vasily Kazakov (03.06.1977 – 17.02.1981)
 Ivan Silayev (21.2.1981 – 01.11.1985)
 Apollon Systsov (01.11.1985 – 24.08.1991)

References

External links
 

 
Aviation in the Soviet Union
Defence industry of the Soviet Union